Baxter Boulevard is a boulevard and parkway in  Portland, Maine. The roadway served as the means to head north from downtown Portland before Tukey's Bridge, now on Interstate 295 (I-295), was built. The road was part of U.S. Route 1 (US 1) until May 2007. The parkway wraps around the west side of Back Cove estuary basin.

The parkway and roadway began as an initiative of Mayor James Phinney Baxter, for whom it is named. It was envisioned as one of four parks in the city (along with Deering Oaks, Western Promenade and Eastern Promenade) which would encircle the city. The parkway was designed by the noted landscape design firm Olmsted, Olmsted and Eliot in 1895. Property owners donated the then-useless land next to the cove and the walking and biking path were filled in. Originally called the Back Cove Boulevard, the parkway opened in 1917.

Tree planting began on the Boulevard in 1921 as a memorial to World War I victims.

Baxter Boulevard was listed on the National Register of Historic Places as a historic landscape district in October 1989.

References

Baxter family
U.S. Route 1
1917 establishments in Maine
Parks in Portland, Maine
Streets in Portland, Maine
World War I memorials in the United States